The Fearmonger is a Big Finish Productions audio drama based on the long-running British science fiction television series Doctor Who.

Plot
The Seventh Doctor and Ace are on the trail of a monster that not only knows their every move but appears to be able to anticipate their actions too. The head of the far right New Britannia party survives an assassination attempt, but the Doctor suspects there is far more to the affair than the failed slaying of a politician. As he and Ace fight their way through the prejudices which blind everyone touched by a very particular monster, they face the prospect of the entire world being plunged into a bitter war of mistrust and mutual loathing.

Cast
The Doctor — Sylvester McCoy
Ace — Sophie Aldred
Sherilyn Harper — Jacqueline Pearce
Stephen Keyser — Mark Wright
Walter Jacobs — Mark McDonnell
Mick Thompson — Vince Henderson
Paul Tanner — Jonathan Clarkson
Roderick Allingham — Hugh Walters
Alexsandr Karadjic — Jack Gallagher
Tannoy Voice — John Ainsworth

Notes
Actor Vince Henderson is the husband of Sophie Aldred, who plays Ace.

External links
Big Finish Productions – The Fearmonger

Seventh Doctor audio plays
2000 audio plays
Fiction set in 2002